The 1986 Sunkist Women's International Tennis Association (WITA) Championships was a women's tennis tournament played on outdoor clay courts at the Amelia Island Plantation on Amelia Island, Florida in the United States that was part of the 1986 WTA Tour. It was the seventh edition of the tournament and was held from April 14 through April 20, 1986. First-seeded Steffi Graf won the singles title and earned $40,000 first-prize money. The WTA had to pay the tournament organizers a $15,000 fine because both Chris Evert-Lloyd and Martina Navratilova chose not to participate in the event.

Finals

Singles
 Steffi Graf defeated  Claudia Kohde-Kilsch 6–4, 5–7, 7–6(7–3)
 It was Graf's 2nd title of the year and the 2nd of her career.

Doubles
 Claudia Kohde-Kilsch /  Helena Suková defeated  Gabriela Sabatini /  Catherine Tanvier 6–2, 5–7, 7–6(9–7)
 It was Kohde-Kilsch's 2nd title of the year and the 15th of her career. It was Suková's 3rd title of the year and the 13th of her career.

References

External links
 ITF tournament edition details

Sunkist WTA Championships
Amelia Island Championships
Sunkist WTA Championships
Sunkist WTA Championships
Sunkist WTA Championships